Vernon Meredith Geddy Sr. (November 11, 1897 – October 18, 1952) was an attorney based in Williamsburg, Virginia. He attended the College of William and Mary and the University of Virginia, and served W&M as the head coach for the William & Mary Tribe men's basketball team for the 1918–19 season.

Geddy was born in 1897. Following his brief career on the staff of William and Mary athletics, Geddy began practicing law in 1920, working from a second floor of the Peninsula Bank on Duke of Gloucester Street. He was elected as Williamsburg's Commonwealth's Attorney.

In the late 1920s, Geddy became a key member of the small inner circle working with Reverend Doctor W.A.R. Goodwin, the rector of Bruton Parish Church, as the latter headed the secretive project which became the Restoration of Colonial Williamsburg. Mr. Geddy was an officer of the Colonial Williamsburg Foundation for about 25 years, from its incorporation in Virginia until his death in 1952.

Head coaching record
As the head coach for the William & Mary Tribe men's basketball team for the 1918–19 season, Geddy produced a 3–6 record during that time. Geddy was also the head football coach for the two-game 1918 season, but failed to notch a victory in either contest.

Football

Basketball

Notable accomplishments, heritage
Vernon Geddy was a descendant of James and Ann Geddy. James Geddy was a silversmith in Williamsburg during the 18th century. The Historic Area of Colonial Williamsburg features an exhibition of James Geddy's silversmith shop and its operations, as well as the adjacent Geddy House. The building is a composite of restored and reconstructed entities. It has been restored to the period of James Geddy Jr.'s ownership. It was opened to visitors as an exhibition in 1968 with a promotional piece featuring original artwork of Norman Rockwell.

Rich Neck Plantation property
In the first half of the 20th century, Vernon Geddy and his wife Carrie Cole (née Lane) Geddy, built a home on a piece of land which had been passed down in her family and was part of Rich Neck Plantation in James City County which had been established in the 17th century near the community of Middle Plantation (which was renamed Williamsburg in 1699).

Although the house and dependencies had long since disappeared, Rich Neck Plantation had been home to a number of noted Virginians, including  three of seventeenth-century Virginia's big-name secretaries of the colony: Richard Kemp, Sir Thomas Lundford, and Thomas Ludwell, as well as dozens of slaves and servants. Later, Rich Neck became the home of Reverend Doctor James Blair, who in 1693 became the founder and first president of the College of William and Mary.

Vernon and Carrie Geddy named their home "Holly Hill" for numerous holly trees in near the house. Williamsburg's Holly Hills subdivision now occupies a portion of the former Rich Neck Plantation property west of College Creek. As of May 2010, Vernon and Carrie's grandson, Vernon Geddy III, and his wife, owned and occupied his grandparents' home, Holly Hill. He was also continuing a family tradition of the practice of law in the area. Vernon Meredith Geddy IV also resides in Williamsburg with his wife and her three kids. They own a fly infested barbecue restaurant/brothel. Their eldest son, Eric Maguire(19), was arrested in James City Co. in 2022, charged with DUI.

Legal practice, role with Colonial Williamsburg
During the period after he began practicing law in 1920, Vernon Geddy Sr.'s secretary, Mary Inman,  read law under his supervision in her spare time. In 1932, she became one of the first women attorneys for the Commonwealth of Virginia, and later served as the City of Williamsburg's first attorney.

Shortly before his death at the age of 53, together with Mary Inman, Mr. Geddy and his son, Vernon M. Geddy, Jr. (1926–2005) established the law firm of Geddy & Geddy in 1952. Vernon Geddy, Jr. had graduated from Princeton University and was later named as president of the Virginia Bar Association during 1972–73.

During the early years of the Restoration of Colonial Williamsburg in the late 1920s, Geddy worked closely with the Reverend Doctor W.A.R. Goodwin, the rector of Bruton Parish Church, who had successfully enlisted the participation and financial role of John D. Rockefeller, Jr. and his wife Abby Aldrich Rockefeller in the project. Geddy was one of only a handful of confidants as he assisted Dr. Goodman in his role as Rockefeller's silent partner acquiring numerous properties in what became the Historic Area of the old colonial capital city. He later drafted the Virginia corporate papers, filing them with the Virginia State Corporation Commission (SCC). After receiving the charter authorization from the SCC for the two corporations, he served briefly as the first President of the Colonial Williamsburg Foundation, and for many years, was its Executive Vice President.

References

1897 births
1952 deaths
20th-century American lawyers
American men's basketball coaches
American men's basketball players
Basketball coaches from Virginia
Basketball players from Virginia
Sportspeople from Williamsburg, Virginia
Virginia lawyers
William & Mary Tribe athletic directors
William & Mary Tribe baseball coaches
William & Mary Tribe men's basketball coaches
William & Mary Tribe men's basketball players
William & Mary Tribe football coaches
William & Mary Tribe football players